The University of Oxford has three statutory professorships named after William of Wykeham, who founded New College.

Logic
The Wykeham Professorship in Logic was established in 1859, although it was not known as the Wykeham chair until later. Its first chair was Henry Wall.

List of holders of post

 Henry Wall, 1849?–1870
 Thomas Fowler, 1873–1889
 John Cook Wilson, 1889–1915
 Harold Henry Joachim, 1919–1935
 Henry Habberley Price, 1935–1959
 Alfred Jules Ayer, 1959–1978
 Michael Dummett, 1979–1992
 David Wiggins, 1993–2000
 Timothy Williamson, 2000–present

Ancient History
The Wykeham Professorship of Ancient History was established in 1910.  It concentrates on Greek history to avoid possible duplication with the far older Camden Professorship of Ancient History, which focuses primarily on Roman history.

List of holders of post
 J. L. Myres, 1910–1939
 Theodore Wade-Gery, 1939–1953
 Antony Andrewes, 1953–1977
 W. G. (George) Forrest, 1977–1992
 Robert Parker, 1996–2016
 Nino Luraghi, 2018–present

Physics
The Wykeham Professorship of Physics is the only endowed chair in the Rudolf Peierls Centre for Theoretical Physics at the University of Oxford. This professorship is associated with New College.

List of holders of post
 John Sealy Townsend, 1900–1941
 Maurice Pryce, 1946–1955
 Willis Lamb, 1957–1962
 Sir Rudolf Peierls, 1963–1974
 Sir Roger Elliott, 1974–1988
 David Sherrington, 1989–2008
 Shivaji Sondhi, 2021–present.

Tencent Chair of Theoretical Physics
In February 2021 The Times reported that the Wykeham Professorship of Physics was to be renamed "Tencent-Wykeham Professorship of Physics" following a donation, but the University later said the Wykeham Professorship of Physics will not be renamed; instead the current holder will also be given a separate post called "Tencent Chair of Theoretical Physics" to run concurrently with his Wykeham post.

References

Professorships at the University of Oxford
Professorships in classics
Professorships in history
Professorships in philosophy
Professorships in physics
Lists of people associated with the University of Oxford